"Stupid Girl (Only In Hollywood)" is a single by Saving Abel from their second album Miss America. The song was inspired by Keith Urban's song Stupid Boy, which Null heard while traveling to Nashville to record, and thought Stupid Girl would be a great song title.

Track listings
Digital single
"Stupid Girl (Only in Hollywood)" — 4:19

Digital single (radio edit)
"Stupid Girl (Only in Hollywood)" (radio edit) — 3:59

Digital EP
"Stupid Girl (Only in Hollywood)" (radio edit) — 4:00
"The Sex Is Good" (acoustic version) — 3:33
"Tooth and Nail" — 3:30

Charts

Weekly charts

Year-end charts

Release history

References

2010 singles
Saving Abel songs
Virgin Records singles
2010 songs
Songs written by Skidd Mills